In mathematics, the Hessian matrix or Hessian is a square matrix of second-order partial derivatives of a scalar-valued function, or scalar field. It describes the local curvature of a function of many variables. The Hessian matrix was developed in the 19th century by the German mathematician Ludwig Otto Hesse and later named after him. Hesse originally used the term "functional determinants".

Definitions and properties 

That is, the entry of the th row and the th column is

If furthermore the second partial derivatives are all continuous, the Hessian matrix is a symmetric matrix by the symmetry of second derivatives.

The Hessian matrix of a function  is the Jacobian matrix of the gradient of the function ; that is:

Applications

Inflection points 

If  is a homogeneous polynomial in three variables, the equation  is the implicit equation of a plane projective curve. The inflection points of the curve are exactly the non-singular points where the Hessian determinant is zero. It follows by Bézout's theorem that a cubic plane curve has at most  inflection points, since the Hessian determinant is a polynomial of degree

Second-derivative test 

The Hessian matrix of a convex function is positive semi-definite. Refining this property allows us to test whether a critical point  is a local maximum, local minimum, or a saddle point, as follows:

If the Hessian is positive-definite at  then  attains an isolated local minimum at  If the Hessian is negative-definite at  then  attains an isolated local maximum at  If the Hessian has both positive and negative eigenvalues, then  is a saddle point for  Otherwise the test is inconclusive. This implies that at a local minimum the Hessian is positive-semidefinite, and at a local maximum the Hessian is negative-semidefinite.

For positive-semidefinite and negative-semidefinite Hessians the test is inconclusive (a critical point where the Hessian is semidefinite but not definite may be a local extremum or a saddle point). However, more can be said from the point of view of Morse theory.

The second-derivative test for functions of one and two variables is simpler than the general case. In one variable, the Hessian contains exactly one second derivative; if it is positive, then  is a local minimum, and if it is negative, then  is a local maximum; if it is zero, then the test is inconclusive. In two variables, the determinant can be used, because the determinant is the product of the eigenvalues. If it is positive, then the eigenvalues are both positive, or both negative. If it is negative, then the two eigenvalues have different signs. If it is zero, then the second-derivative test is inconclusive.

Equivalently, the second-order conditions that are sufficient for a local minimum or maximum can be expressed in terms of the sequence of principal (upper-leftmost) minors (determinants of sub-matrices) of the Hessian; these conditions are a special case of those given in the next section for bordered Hessians for constrained optimization—the case in which the number of constraints is zero. Specifically, the sufficient condition for a minimum is that all of these principal minors be positive, while the sufficient condition for a maximum is that the minors alternate in sign, with the  minor being negative.

Critical points 

The Hessian matrix plays an important role in Morse theory and catastrophe theory, because its kernel and eigenvalues allow classification of the critical points.

The determinant of the Hessian matrix, when evaluated at a critical point of a function, is equal to the Gaussian curvature of the function considered as a manifold. The eigenvalues of the Hessian at that point are the principal curvatures of the function, and the eigenvectors are the principal directions of curvature. (See .)

Use in optimization 

Hessian matrices are used in large-scale optimization problems within Newton-type methods because they are the coefficient of the quadratic term of a local Taylor expansion of a function. That is,

where  is the gradient  Computing and storing the full Hessian matrix takes  memory, which is infeasible for high-dimensional functions such as the loss functions of neural nets, conditional random fields, and other statistical models with large numbers of parameters. For such situations, truncated-Newton and quasi-Newton algorithms have been developed. The latter family of algorithms use approximations to the Hessian; one of the most popular quasi-Newton algorithms is BFGS.

Such approximations may use the fact that an optimization algorithm uses the Hessian only as a linear operator  and proceed by first noticing that the Hessian also appears in the local expansion of the gradient:

Letting  for some scalar  this gives

that is,

so if the gradient is already computed, the approximate Hessian can be computed by a linear (in the size of the gradient) number of scalar operations. (While simple to program, this approximation scheme is not numerically stable since  has to be made small to prevent error due to the  term, but decreasing it loses precision in the first term.)

Notably regarding Randomized Search Heuristics, the evolution strategy's covariance matrix adapts to the inverse of the Hessian matrix, up to a scalar factor and small random fluctuations.
This result has been formally proven for a single-parent strategy and a static model, as the population size increases, relying on the quadratic approximation.

Other applications 

The Hessian matrix is commonly used for expressing image processing operators in image processing and computer vision (see the Laplacian of Gaussian (LoG) blob detector, the determinant of Hessian (DoH) blob detector and scale space). It can be used in normal mode analysis to calculate the different molecular frequencies in infrared spectroscopy. It can also be used in local sensitivity and statistical diagnostics.

Generalizations

Bordered Hessian 

A  is used for the second-derivative test in certain constrained optimization problems. Given the function  considered previously, but adding a constraint function  such that  the bordered Hessian is the Hessian of the Lagrange function 

If there are, say,  constraints then the zero in the upper-left corner is an  block of zeros, and there are  border rows at the top and  border columns at the left.

The above rules stating that extrema are characterized (among critical points with a non-singular Hessian) by a positive-definite or negative-definite Hessian cannot apply here since a bordered Hessian can neither be negative-definite nor positive-definite, as  if  is any vector whose sole non-zero entry is its first.

The second derivative test consists here of sign restrictions of the determinants of a certain set of  submatrices of the bordered Hessian. Intuitively, the  constraints can be thought of as reducing the problem to one with  free variables. (For example, the maximization of  subject to the constraint  can be reduced to the maximization of  without constraint.)

Specifically, sign conditions are imposed on the sequence of leading principal minors (determinants of upper-left-justified sub-matrices) of the bordered Hessian, for which the first  leading principal minors are neglected, the smallest minor consisting of the truncated first  rows and columns, the next consisting of the truncated first  rows and columns, and so on, with the last being the entire bordered Hessian; if  is larger than  then the smallest leading principal minor is the Hessian itself. There are thus  minors to consider, each evaluated at the specific point being considered as a candidate maximum or minimum.

Vector-valued functions 

If  is instead a vector field  that is,

then the collection of second partial derivatives is not a  matrix, but rather a third-order tensor. This can be thought of as an array of  Hessian matrices, one for each component of :

This tensor degenerates to the usual Hessian matrix when

Generalization to the complex case 

In the context of several complex variables, the Hessian may be generalized.  Suppose  and write   Then the generalized Hessian is   If  satisfies the n-dimensional Cauchy–Riemann conditions, then the complex Hessian matrix is identically zero.

Generalizations to Riemannian manifolds 

Let  be a Riemannian manifold and  its Levi-Civita connection. Let  be a smooth function. Define the Hessian tensor by

where this takes advantage of the fact that the first covariant derivative of a function is the same as its ordinary differential. Choosing local coordinates  gives a local expression for the Hessian as

where  are the Christoffel symbols of the connection. Other equivalent forms for the Hessian are given by

See also 

 The determinant of the Hessian matrix is a covariant; see Invariant of a binary form
 Polarization identity, useful for rapid calculations involving Hessians.

Notes

Further reading

External links 
 
 

Differential operators
Matrices
Morse theory
Multivariable calculus
Singularity theory